El Espinal --Spanish for 'the spine' is a town and municipality in Oaxaca in southwestern Mexico. The municipality covers an area of 82.93 km².  It is part of the Juchitán District in the west of the Istmo de Tehuantepec region. In 2005 the municipality had a total population of 8,219.

El Espinal is a plane zone ideal for agriculture. The climate is very warm and somewhat humid. This municipality shares boundaries with Asunción Ixtaltepec on the north side, with other municipalities named Comitancillo and San Pedro Comitancillo to the west side, and Juchitán de Zaragoza to the south.

History
El Espinal was considered a town in 1808, a couple years before Mexican Independence. This zone did not play an important role during the toughest years of the struggle for the independence of Mexico. Non of the important movements towards independence started here. Nor any of the important personalities that fought for independence was originally from this municipality. El Espinal remained isolated from national events that took place elsewhere.

Infrastructure
Regarding education in the Municipality. There is only one kindergarten, four grammar schools, two middle schools and only one high school. There is also only one computer lab and a small English school. There is only one health care center for the municipality, it only provides basic services and first aid. Sports are very important in this municipality. Young people enjoy themselves at the sports facilities. There are two small soccer fields, two basketball courts, and a track for running. The most important place is the baseball field. Many well known Mexican professionals in baseball come from Oaxacan Municipality el Espinal. In regard to population and according to a local source from 2005, there are about 2,172 houses from which 2,115 are owned by the population.

Gastronomy 
Traditional foods in El Espinal include the black mole, stewed beef, jerked beef, tamales, marquesote, garnachas, corn tamales, chiles stuffed with different types of meat and seafood.

References

Municipalities of Oaxaca